The Meeting Place Cannot Be Changed is a 1979 Soviet five-part television miniseries directed by Stanislav Govorukhin. It was a cult classic in the USSR and, along with Seventeen Moments of Spring, became a part of popular culture to several generations of Russian-language viewers. It stars singer-songwriter Vladimir Vysotsky in one of his final screen appearances. Soviet screen and stage actors Sergey Yursky, Armen Dzhigarkhanyan, Zinovy Gerdt, Yevgeniy Yevstigneyev, and Leonid Kuravlev also appear.

The series was released in the West as The Age of Mercy, after the original novel by the Vayner Brothers on which it is based.

Plot
The story is set in post-WW2 Moscow. Lieutenant Vladimir Sharapov (Vladimir Konkin) is a young reconnaissance officer who has just returned from the war and is assigned to peacetime service with the famous MUR (Moscow Department of Criminal Investigations). There he becomes part of an elite detective team led by Captain Gleb Zheglov (Vladimir Vysotsky). The duo becomes embroiled in two seemingly unrelated investigations: that of the murder of young aspiring actress Larisa Gruzdeva, and the hunt for a brazen, vicious gang of armed robbers that calls itself "The Black Cat" and constantly manages to evade capture.

While suspicion in Gruzdeva's murder initially falls on her estranged husband Dr. Gruzdev (Sergey Yursky), it gradually becomes obvious that the two cases are connected, as a Black Cat mobster Fox (Aleksandr Belyavsky) is implicated in the murder. As a result of Zheglov's successful high-stakes operation to capture Fox, Sharapov inadvertently finds himself undercover at the Black Cat hideout, sparring with the gang's menacing leader, the Hunchback (Armen Dzhigarkhanyan).

Analysis
Much of the series revolves around the relationship between Zheglov and Sharapov. While the two become close friends and roommates, they are essentially opposites who often clash. At the root of the conflict lies idealistic Sharapov's disagreement with Zheglov's "ends justify the means" approach to law enforcement. Zheglov, hardened and cynical from spending the war years in the rear fighting organized crime thinks that "a thief's place is in prison, and the public couldn't care less about how I put him there". To that end, Zheglov doesn't hesistate to use dubious tactics such as planting evidence to justify the arrest of a notorious pickpocket. Sharapov, on the other hand, considers that the law is a higher value for its own sake and cannot be used merely as a tool. A tense conflict also arises when, in order to mislead Fox, Zheglov elects to continue keeping Gruzdev under arrest even after it becomes clear that the man is innocent.

Production

The series title is a reference to its finale, where Sharapov's botched attempt to withdraw after making contact with the gang forces Zheglov to follow a previously discarded plan for a risky undercover operation. Hoping that Sharapov will lure the bandits to the scene of a prior robbery as they have previously rehearsed, Zheglov utters: "The place and time of the operation cannot be changed."

According to some recollections, Vysotsky played a major creative role in the making of the series. He conceived the idea of turning the novel into a movie after receiving an advance copy of the book from the Vayner brothers, and he actively campaigned for the part of Zheglov despite the fact that the character in the novel was a much younger man. During production, Vysotsky frequently substituted for Govorukhin as director, including directing the entire scene of Dr. Gruzdev's interrogation, and he also invented the comical attributes of the character of Kostya "The Brick" Saprykin (a good-natured pickpocket with a speech impediment).

Young actor Ivan Bortnik (a close friend of Vysotsky) was praised for his vivid and accurate portrayal of the Black Cat henchman Promokashkathe role that dominated his further acting career. Often typecast as a stereotypical Russian criminal, Bortnik is actually a highly educated man hailing from a family of Moscow academics. He created his iconic part (most of it ad-libbed since the creators had only envisioned a minor supporting role with little dialogue) only by recollecting his occasional street contacts with young criminal wannabes.

Similarly, veteran film and voice-over actor Aleksandr Belyavsky was routinely approached in the street by ex-convicts who expressed admiration for what they thought to be the actor's former criminal background, citing the scene of Fox's interrogation where he is bleeding from his lip and arrogantly wipes the blood on the side of Sharapov's desk. In reality, Belyavsky had no criminal background whatsoever, and he improvised the entire scene by using cherry preserves he had borrowed from production assistants during a lunch break to simulate the blood.

One of the film's best known comical scenes originated from an acting gaffe. While signing a written affidavit, prostitute Manka "Obligatsiya" asks Zheglov whether her nickname (Russian for government bond) is properly spelled with an "O" or an "A". Zheglov responds absentmindedly with the correct spelling, before realizing what she was asking and directing her to sign her real name instead. Actress Larisa Udovichenko has revealed that the entire moment was unscripted and she actually asked about the spelling because she had been unsure, with Vysotsky deciding to play along. Director Stanislav Govorukhin liked the impromptu and included it in the film.

Sharapov's love interest patrolwoman Varya Sinichkina dies at the end of the novel. The ending was altered in the movie because the studio administrator thought it was too depressing. The Vayner brothers later admitted that they liked the new happy ending better.

The series was originally intended to have seven parts, but Soviet broadcast authorities ordered two trimmed. As a result, many scenes were left out of the final cut and the Vayners struggled to maintain the narrative flow.

Cast
 Vladimir Vysotsky as Gleb Zheglov
 Vladimir Konkin as Vladimir Sharapov
 Sergei Yursky as Dr. Ivan Gruzdev
 Natalya Danilova as Varvara Sinichkina
 Viktor Pavlov as Sergey Levchenko, Sharapov's former comrade-in-arms, member of the Black Cat gang
 Leonid Kuravlyov as Valentin Bisyaev ("Val'ka Kopchonyiy"), thief
 Aleksandr Belyavsky as Fox, ranking member of the Black Cat gang
 Evgeni Evstigneev as Petr Ruchnikov ("Pet'ka Ruchechnik"), fur coat thief
 Armen Dzhigarkhanyan as "The Hunchback" ("Gorbatyiy"), leader of the Black Cat gang
 Larisa Udovichenko as Mariya Kolyvanova ("Manka Obligatsiya"), prostitute
 Stanislav Sadalskiy as Konstantin "The Brick" Saprykin ("Kostya Kirpich"), pickpocket
 Valeriya Zaklunna as Klasha, The Hunchback's girlfriend
 Zinoviy Gerdt as Mikhail Bomze, Sharapov's neighbour
 Aleksandr Abdulov as "Loshak", driver for the Black Cat gang
 Yekaterina Gradova as Svetlana Volokushuna, "Ruchechnik"'s accomplice
 Ivan Bortnik as "Promokashka", member of the Black Cat gang

Cultural impact
The film's massive popularity made it a major source for the Soviet and post-Soviet popular culture.

Armen Dzhigarkhanyan lampooned his own performance as The Hunchback in a 1998 installment of a popular Armenian sketch comedy series Our Backyard.
In 2010, Russian Prime Minister Vladimir Putin used Zheglov's famous "a thief's place is in prison" line in widely criticized remarks against the jailed tycoon Mikhail Khodorkovsky.
A sculpture featuring Vysotsky and Konkin (as Zheglov and Sharapov) is installed outside the Internal Affairs Ministry building in Kyiv, Ukraine.
In 1998, Russian TV star Leonid Parfyonov made a commemorative documentary Meeting Place, 20 Years Later, putting the history of the series' creation in the wider social context of both the plot and the production eras. Parfyonov interviewed members and acquaintances of the cast and crew as well as actual police detectives and criminals of the 1970s.

References

External links

"Место встречи. 20 лет спустя" – Leonid Parfyonov's documentary :

Vladimir Vysotsky
Vayner Brothers
1970s Soviet television series
 Russian police procedural television series
Soviet television miniseries
1979 in the Soviet Union
1970s television miniseries
Soviet crime television series
Fictional portrayals of the Moscow City Police